The Yaéré, from Fula , is the name of a vast annually-flooded grassland and savanna, part of the extensive floodplains around the shallow and variable Lake Chad in Central Africa. The Yaéré is part of the Lake Chad flooded savanna ecoregion.

Geography
The Yaéré covers areas of northeasternmost Nigeria, of Niger, of southern Chad and of the Far North Region of Cameroon.  The Yaéré extends from the low hills at the base of the Mandara Mountains in the southwest to Lake Chad in the north. In the east it merges with the permanent wetlands bordering the Logone. At the beginning of the wet season the clays that compose the soil expand and form an impermeable pan over which the water collects.

It is connected to the more permanent wetlands along the Logone River, which flows into the endorheic Lake Chad and seasonally overflows into the surrounding Yaéré savanna. Torrential seasonal rains also drain from the Mandara Mountains, bringing a rich sediment to the floodplain. The ecological richness of the Yaéré derives from its particular conditions of wet-season flooding and dry season drought.

Conservation
Drought years when rains fail, such as in the 1970s, are particularly harsh on this delicately balanced ecosystem, and on the local human population that depends on seasonal fishing.

Waza National Park of Cameroon lies in the southwest part of the Yaéré savanna.

See also

Lake Chad topics
Freshwater ecoregions of Africa

Notes

Lake Chad
Flooded grasslands and savannas
Grasslands of Cameroon
Grasslands of Chad
Grasslands of Niger
Grasslands of Nigeria
Wetlands of Cameroon
Wetlands of Chad
Wetlands of Niger
Wetlands of Nigeria